Stanley Delong Benham (December 21, 1913 – April 22, 1970) was an American bobsledder who competed from the late 1940s to the early 1960s. At the 1952 Winter Olympics in Oslo, he barely lost the gold medals in both the two-man and four-man events.

Benham also won seven medals at the FIBT World Championships with two golds (Four-man: 1949, 1950), four silvers (Two-man: 1950, 1951; Four-man: 1951, 1961), and one bronze (Two-man: 1954).

After retiring from bobsleigh, Benham served as a sports official with the FIBT (International Bobsleigh and Tobogganing Federation).

External links
 
 

1913 births
1970 deaths
Bobsledders at the 1952 Winter Olympics
Medalists at the 1952 Winter Olympics
Olympic silver medalists for the United States in bobsleigh
American male bobsledders